The 2011 IIHF World U18 Championship Division III was an international under-18 ice hockey competition organised by the International Ice Hockey Federation. Both Division III tournaments made up the fourth level of the IIHF World U18 Championships. The Group A tournament was played in Taipei, Taiwan, and the Group B tournament was played in Mexico City, Mexico. Australia and Iceland won the Group A and B tournaments respectively and gained promotion to the Division II of the 2012 IIHF World U18 Championships.

Group A
The Group A tournament was played in Taipei, Taiwan, from 11 to 17 April 2011.

Group Standings

Results
All times local (CST/UTC+8).

Semi-finals

Third-place play-off

Final

Final Standings

Group B
The Group B tournament was played in Mexico City, Mexico, from 13 to 20 March 2011.

Final Standings

Results
All times local (CST/UTC−6).

See also
 2011 IIHF World U18 Championships
 2011 IIHF World U18 Championship Division I
 2011 IIHF World U18 Championship Division II
 List of sporting events in Taiwan

References

External links 
 IIHF.com

IIHF World U18 Championship Division III
III
International ice hockey competitions hosted by Mexico